Thomas Doughty is an English, Cheshire-based lap steel acoustic guitarist and singer-songwriter, who has released four albums. His style is free-flowing and improvisational, drawing from the blues, folk and jazz-swing standards. He has played at venues all over the United Kingdom and frequently visits the United States. In December 2003, he was the featured artist on Paul Jones' blues show on BBC Radio 2 and has been featured on that show several times since, as well as other international radio programmes.

Discography
The Bell (2002)
Running Free (2005)
Have A Taste Of This (2008)
Journeyman Blues – Single (2012) – Journeyman Blues & Your Picture Has Faded (feat. Nick Boyes & Mike Sturgis)
Can't Teach An Old Dog (2017)

References

External links
Interview

Year of birth missing (living people)
Place of birth missing (living people)
Living people
English blues guitarists
English male guitarists
English blues singers
English male singer-songwriters
Musicians from Cheshire